Hyalurga melania is a moth of the family Erebidae. It was described by Hering in 1925. It is found in the Neotropical realm.

References

Hyalurga
Moths described in 1925